The 1998 CONCACAF Women's Championship was the fourth staging of the CONCACAF Women's Championship, the international women's association football tournament for North America, Central America and Caribbean nations organized by CONCACAF. The final stage of the tournament took place at Etobicoke and Scarborough in Toronto, Ontario, Canada. Canada took the sole automatic qualifying place for the 1999 FIFA Women's World Cup by finishing first. The runner-up, Mexico, qualified after defeating Argentina in a two-leg playoff in December 1998.

The tournament was originally planned to take place in Haiti, but was moved due to disputes between the Haitian government and the Haitian Football Federation. This was the only edition of CONCACAF's Women's Championship or the CONCACAF Women's Gold Cup in which the traditional superpower of CONCACAF women's football, the United States, did not participate. This was because they directly qualified for the 1999 Women's World Cup as hosts of the event.

Qualification

UNCAF Qualifying Tournament
The 1998 UNCAF Qualifying Tournament took place in Guatemala City between 19 July and 25 July 1998. It was won by the hosts Guatemala after defeating Haiti 1–0 in the final match. Guatemala, Haiti and Costa Rica qualified for the 1998 CONCACAF Women's Championship.

Group A

Group B

Third place play-off

Final

CFU Qualifying Round
The CFU Qualifying Round consisted of home-and-away ties. It is not clear whether Martinique and Puerto Rico received a bye to the finals, or whether their (unknown) intended opponents withdrew.

|}
1 Haiti were to play Bahamas but apparently the latter withdrew.

Costa Rica, Guatemala, Haiti, Martinique, Puerto Rico and Trinidad and Tobago qualified for the final tournament.

Participating teams

Venues

Final tournament

Group A

Group B

Knockout stage

Bracket

Semi-finals

Third place playoff

Final
Canada won the tournament and qualified for 1999 FIFA Women's World Cup. Mexico advanced to CONCACAF–CONMEBOL play-off.

Awards

Statistics

Final ranking

References

External links
Tables & results at RSSSF.com

Women's Championship
CONCACAF Women's Championship tournaments
1999 FIFA Women's World Cup qualification
International women's association football competitions hosted by Canada
Wome
CON
International sports competitions in Toronto
September 1998 sports events in Canada
1998 in Canadian women's sports